The Richmond Rebels were an American football team based in Richmond, Virginia that played in the Dixie League in 1946 and the American Association from 1947 to 1950. The squad played in the playoffs from 1948 to 1950. It won the league championship in 1949 and 1950, the league's final season.

Another team by that name played in the Virginia-Carolina Football League in 1937.

References

Defunct American football teams in Virginia
American football teams established in 1946
American football teams disestablished in 1950
1946 establishments in Virginia
1950 disestablishments in Virginia
Sports in Richmond, Virginia